Tsinghua-Berkeley Shenzhen Institute (TBSI) is an institute which was established in Shenzhen, China in 2014 according to an agreement signed by Tsinghua University, University of California, Berkeley (UC Berkeley), and the Shenzhen government. 

The purpose of the establishment of the institute is seeking to develop a research program that will enable the sort of complex, multidisciplinary collaborations necessary to successfully confront societal and economic challenges that will be faced in China and United States as well as those on a worldwide scale.

Mission
Establish an ecosystem for transformational technology research addressing global challenges in environmental science and new energy technology, precision medicine and healthcare, and data science and information technology. Build trans-disciplinary innovative research platforms and graduate curricula. Foster future entrepreneurs and leaders in science and technology.

Philosophy
The vision of TBSI is to build a world-class transformative research and education partnership to fuel economic growth with accelerated innovation through transdisciplinary and translational research.

See also
 List of universities and colleges in Guangdong
 Tsinghua Shenzhen International Graduate School
 Tsinghua University
 University of California, Berkeley

References

External links
 Chen, Hong. "Tsinghua, Berkeley prepare joint institute." China Daily. September 8, 2014.
 Tsinghua-Berkeley Shenzhen Institute
 Tsinghua-Berkeley Shenzhen Institute  
 UC Berkeley Official Website for Tsinghua-Berkeley Shenzhen Institute

Tsinghua University
University of California, Berkeley
2014 establishments in China
Universities and colleges in Shenzhen